Kavinda Pulukkuttiarachchi (born 21 February 1995) is a Sri Lankan first-class cricketer. He made his first-class debut for Kurunegala Youth Cricket Club in Tier B of the 2016–17 Premier League Tournament on 21 December 2016.

References

External links
 

1995 births
Living people
Sri Lankan cricketers
Kurunegala Youth Cricket Club cricketers
People from Kandy